Yttrium iron garnet (YIG) is a kind of synthetic garnet, with chemical composition , or Y3Fe5O12. It is a ferrimagnetic material with a Curie temperature of 560 K. YIG may also be known as yttrium ferrite garnet, or as iron yttrium oxide or yttrium iron oxide, the latter two names usually associated with powdered forms.

In YIG, the five iron(III) ions occupy two octahedral and three tetrahedral sites, with the yttrium(III) ions coordinated by eight oxygen ions in an irregular cube. The iron ions in the two coordination sites exhibit different spins, resulting in magnetic behavior. By substituting specific sites with rare-earth elements, for example, interesting magnetic properties can be obtained.

YIG has a high Verdet constant which results in the Faraday effect, high Q factor in microwave frequencies, low absorption of infrared wavelengths down to 1200 nm,  and very small linewidth in electron spin resonance. These properties make it useful for MOI (magneto optical imaging) applications in superconductors.

YIG is used in microwave, acoustic, optical, and magneto-optical applications, e.g. microwave YIG filters, or acoustic transmitters and transducers. It is transparent for light wavelengths over 600 nm — the infrared end of the spectrum. It also finds use in solid-state lasers in Faraday rotators, in data storage, and in various nonlinear optics applications.

See also
 Gadolinium gallium garnet
 Terbium gallium garnet
 Yttrium aluminium garnet
 YIG sphere

References

Synthetic minerals
Iron(III) compounds
Yttrium compounds
Nonlinear optical materials
Ferromagnetic materials
Transition metal oxides